Petrakovskoye is a rural locality (a selo) in Mogilevsky Selsoviet, Khasavyurtovsky District, Republic of Dagestan, Russia. The population was 2,963 as of 2010. There are 28 streets.

Geography 
Petrakovskoye is located 6 km east of Khasavyurt (the district's administrative centre) by road. Mogilyovskoye is the nearest rural locality.

References 

Rural localities in Khasavyurtovsky District